Rosenwald School is a Rosenwald school on Arkansas Highway 26 in Delight, Arkansas. The school, a single-story wood-frame structure with a gable roof, was built in 1938 by the Works Progress Administration. Philanthropist Julius Rosenwald sponsored the Rosenwald schools to provide education for African-Americans in rural communities; the Julius Rosenwald Fund helped build 389 schools in Arkansas, including the one in Delight. The school closed in the 1970s, when many of the Rosenwald schools closed due to desegregation.  It is now used as a local community center.

The Rosenwald School was added to the National Register of Historic Places in 1990.

See also
National Register of Historic Places listings in Pike County, Arkansas

References

School buildings completed in 1938
Schools in Pike County, Arkansas
Colonial Revival architecture in Arkansas
Rosenwald schools in Arkansas
School buildings on the National Register of Historic Places in Arkansas
Works Progress Administration in Arkansas
National Register of Historic Places in Pike County, Arkansas
Former school buildings in the United States
Historically segregated African-American schools in Arkansas
1938 establishments in Arkansas
Community centers in Arkansas